The 2017 Cal State Fullerton Titans baseball team represented California State University, Fullerton in the 2017 NCAA Division I baseball season.  The Titans played their home games at Goodwin Field and were members of the Big West Conference.  The team was coached by Rick Vanderhook in his 6th season at Cal State Fullerton.

The Titans reached the College World Series for the 18th time in school history, where they were eliminated in two games.

Roster

Schedule and results

References

Cal State Fullerton
Cal State Fullerton Titans baseball seasons
Cal State Fullerton
College World Series seasons
Fullerton Titans